Rockland Mansion is a -story Federal-style mansion located in east Fairmount Park, Philadelphia, overlooking the Schuylkill River. The land was bought by a Philadelphia merchant named George Thomson in 1809. The mansion was completed circa 1810 using rubble stone for the masonry work which was then finished with stucco scored to resemble cut stone. Thomson used the house as a summer residence for about five years and then sold it to another merchant named Isaac Jones in 1815 whose son sold it to the city in 1870.

Beginning in 2002, the Psychoanalytic Center of Philadelphia (PCoP) entered into a long-term lease arrangement with the city, via the Fairmount Park Conservancy's Historic Preservation Trust. Between 2002 and 2005, PCoP restored the house with help from the trust.  PCoP relocated their administrative offices to the mansion, and schedules educational and community-related activities there. The city's leasing agreements for Fairmount Park properties require lessees to commit financial resources to help with restoration and ongoing maintenance work. The lessees are not permitted to alter the historic architectural features of the structures, and must allow for public access.

Rockland Mansion is registered on the Philadelphia Register of Historic Places and is an inventoried structure within the Fairmount Park Historic District entry on the National Register of Historic Places.

See also 

 List of houses in Fairmount Park
 National Register of Historic Places listings in North Philadelphia – an inventoried structure within the Fairmount Park listing

References

External links 

Houses in Fairmount Park
Philadelphia Register of Historic Places
North Philadelphia
Houses on the National Register of Historic Places in Philadelphia
Federal architecture in Pennsylvania
Historic American Buildings Survey in Philadelphia
East Fairmount Park
Psychoanalysis organizations